Nead or NEAD may refer to:
 Nintendo Entertainment Analysis & Development
 Non-epileptic attack disorder

People 
 Benjamin Matthias Nead (1847–1923), American historian and lawyer
 Peter Nead (1796–1877), American preacher and theologian
 Spencer Nead (born 1977), American football player

Places
 Nead, Indiana

See also 
 NEADS (disambiguation)
 Need (disambiguation)